Energy Coast UTC is a University Technical College (UTC) on the outskirts of Workington, Cumbria that opened in September 2014 for students of ages 14–19.

The "Energy Coast" is the coastal region between Silloth and Barrow-in-Furness, it includes the Sellafield nuclear power site and Nuclear Decommissioning Authority as well as wind farms at Walney Island and Robin Rigg.

Description
University technical colleges (UTCs) are usually smaller than average-sized schools for 14-to 19-year-olds. They serve Key Stage 4 and Key Stage 5. They focus heavily, but not exclusively, on STEMsubjects. All their technical, academic and practical learning is designed to be applied in the workplace. A UTC’s specialism usually reflects the local economy. Energy Coast UTC specialises in engineering. After an early period of high staff turnover, the staffing is now stable.The principal has been in post since September 2016. In September 2017, the UTC  extended it Key Stage 4 provision, by enrolling 20 pupils into a new year 9. The college works with two training providers, Gen2 and the Lakes College, who offer engineering and construction courses.

History
The UTC's first Principal, Gary Jones, resigned from his post in November 2015 citing personal reasons. The current Principal, Ms Cherry Tingle, started in September 2016, after a series of Interim Heads.

September 2015 virus scare
On 25 September 2015, Energy Coast UTC was temporarily closed following a suspected viral outbreak on its campus; however it was later discovered that there was no virus. Any symptoms displayed by were found to be unrelated or psychosomatic and there were no lasting effects. As a precaution when the cause was still unknown, the school was closed for two days for a deep clean.

2017 Ofsted
After months of turbulence and two interim principals, Cherry Hinton was appointed as principal in time to front the UTC first Ofsted inspection. Ofsted acknowledged that changes were being implemented, giving an overall judgement of 'Requires improvement' in all five criteria under consideration.

June 2019 Ofsted
Energy Coast UTC had received a 'requires improvement' rating in a 2017 judgement that prompted significant structural changes. In June 2019 it was rated 'outstanding' by Ofsted. Energy Coast is only one of two UTCs to be rated 'outstanding'. It remains under a 'financial notice to improve' from the Department for Education. It was unusual that it 'outsourced' some its teaching to its sponsors without applying compulsory competitive tendering procedures.

Sponsors
The UTC is sponsored and partnered with several local and national companies. The Energy Coast UTC also regularly works with the armed forces, especially the Royal Navy as part of the Combined Cadet Force.

Curriculum
The UTC specialises in STEM subjects (science, technology, engineering and mathematics), with an emphasis on Engineering.
Secondary Level Education includes several engineering qualifications, including the new, industry approved, "Design Engineer Construct!" course.

References

University Technical Colleges
Secondary schools in Cumbria
Educational institutions established in 2014
2014 establishments in England
University of Cumbria